Mauri were the people of the ancient north African kingdom Mauretania

Mauri may also refer to:
Moors, North African people known in Latin as Mauri
Mauri (life force), a concept in traditional Māori religion
Mauri, Estonia, village in Misso Parish, Võru County
Mauri River, in Bolivia and Peru
AB Mauri, a division of Associated British Foods
Mauri (film), 1987 New Zealand film directed by Merata Mita
Mauri (fish), a Trichomycterus catfish found in Poopó Lake, Bolivia
"hello" in the language of the i-Kiribati

Name
Mauri (surname), persons surnamed Mauri

Given name
Mauri (1934–2022), Mauricio Lauzirika, Spanish footballer
Mauri (born 1994), Mauri Franco Barbosa da Silva, brazilian footballer
Mauri Favén (1920–2006), Finnish painter
Mauri Fonseca (born 1941), Brazilian Olympic swimmer
Mauri Holappa (born 1965), Finnish footballer and coach
Mauri König, Brazilian journalist
Mauri Kunnas (born 1950), Finnish cartoonist and author
Mauri Nyberg-Noroma (1908–1939), Finnish gymnast
Mauri Pekkarinen (born 1947), Finnish politician
Mauri Repo (1945–2002), Finnish athletic administrator
Mauri Röppänen (born 1946), Finnish Olympia biathlete
Mauri Rose (1906–1981), American racecar driver
Mauri Ryömä (1911–1958), Finnish physician and politician
Mauri Seppä (1916–2000), Finnish agronomist, farmer, and politician
Mauri Valtonen, Finnish astronomer
Mauri Wasi (born 1982), Papua New Guinean footballer

See also
 , includes persons with Mauri as given name